Río Pico is a town in Tehuelches Department, province of Chubut, Argentina.

The town owes its name to the engineer Octavio Pico Burgess (1837–1892), in honor of his task as an expert in the border conflict between Argentina and Chile.

Population
In 2001 the town had 1,055 inhabitants (INDEC, 2001), representing an increase of 11.3% compared to the 948 inhabitants (INDEC, 1991) in the previous census.

Climate
A weather station in the town worked briefly in 1928. 
Like nearby Balmaceda, Río Pico has a cold-summer Mediterranean climate (Köppen Csc).

References

External links
 Río Pico page at Patagonia Express

Populated places in Chubut Province